The 1919 All-Ireland Senior Football Championship was the 33rd staging of Ireland's premier Gaelic football knock-out competition. In the Leinster semi-final Dublin ended Wexford's 4 year period as All Ireland champions but lost Leinster final to Kildare were the winners.

Results

Connacht Senior Football Championship

Leinster Senior Football Championship

Munster Senior Football Championship

Ulster Senior Football Championship

All-Ireland Senior Football Championship

Championship statistics

Miscellaneous
 Galway play in their first All Ireland final but lose it to Kildare.

References

All-Ireland Senior Football Championship